Istria is the largest peninsula within the Adriatic Sea. The peninsula is located at the head of the Adriatic between the Gulf of Trieste and the Kvarner Gulf. It is shared by three countries: Croatia, Slovenia, and Italy. Croatia encapsulates most of the Istrian peninsula with its Istria County.

Historical flags

Yugoslav period

Flags of cities and municipalities

Cities in Croatian Istria

Slovenia

Italy

References 

Istria
Istria